Whitesnake is the seventh studio album by British rock band Whitesnake, released on 23 March 1987 by Geffen Records in the United States, and by EMI Records in the UK one week later. It was co-written and recorded for over a year in what would be the first and final collaboration between vocalist David Coverdale and guitarist John Sykes, as well as the final album to feature longtime bassist Neil Murray. The album, besides its commercial success, is remarkable for the band's change to a more modern glam metal look and sound, and the first recording to use the band's new logo which would characterise them in the future.

Initially the album was released worldwide with different titles, tracklists and by different record labels. In Europe and Australia, it was titled 1987 and included two extra songs absent from the North American version, "Looking for Love" and "You're Gonna Break My Heart Again", while in Japan the album was released as Serpens Albus with the North American tracklist. The 20th and 30th anniversary remastered reissues have a common tracklist, including the additional tracks.

The album was a critical and commercial success around the world, eventually selling over 8 million copies in the US alone and thus going eight times Platinum by RIAA in February 1995. It peaked at No. 2 on the US Billboard 200 for ten nonconsecutive weeks, barred from the top spot by three different albums, including Michael Jackson's Bad, and was more weeks in the Top 5 than any other album in 1987. Whitesnake was the band's highest-charting album in the US and peaked at No. 8 on the UK Albums Chart.

Four songs were released as official singles, "Still of the Night", "Here I Go Again '87", "Is This Love", "Give Me All Your Love ('88 Mix)", and one as a promotional single, "Crying in the Rain '87". Among them, "Here I Go Again" and "Is This Love" are the band's most successful charting hits, topping the Billboard Hot 100 at number one and two respectively.

Its success in the US boosted its predecessor, Slide It In (1984), from Gold to double Platinum status by RIAA, and would see the band receive a nomination at the 1988 Brit Awards for Best British Group and at the American Music Awards of 1988 for Favorite Pop/Rock Album.

Background

The supporting tour for Slide It In came to an end in January 1985, when Whitesnake played two shows at the Rock in Rio festival in Brazil. After the band's performance at the last show, drummer Cozy Powell left the group. 
After almost ten years since David Coverdale had started his solo career and formed Whitesnake, he was actually about to fold the band. However, executives at Geffen Records asked Coverdale to continue working with guitarist John Sykes, as they saw potential in the two. Whitesnake had previously signed with Geffen for distribution in the US and Canada only, while in Europe they remained with EMI.

Songwriting and production
Coverdale wanted the band's sound "to be leaner, meaner and more electrifying ... felt it was time for a change. I didn’t want to stay in the same old traditional blues and pop scenario". It was kind of "Americanization", but rather than following popular trends, "it was a series of synchronised elements that came together". However, Coverdale recalls that "the only downside was it was the only time I’d embraced a fashion presentation, as opposed to being stylized in what I do. I think that disappointed a lot of my hardcore people".

In the spring of 1985, Coverdale and Sykes decamped to the town of Le Rayol in the south of France to start writing material for a new album. According to Coverdale, bassist Neil Murray also helped with some of the arrangements. Two songs that would emerge from these sessions would be two of Whitesnake's biggest hits: "Still of the Night", based on an old demo by Coverdale and Deep Purple guitarist Ritchie Blackmore, and "Is This Love", originally written for Tina Turner. The middle atmospherics with cello riff of "Still of the Night" was Coverdale's idea after experimenting with introduction atmospheric sounds from a synthesizer on "Looking for Love".

Coverdale, Sykes and Murray then moved to Los Angeles, where they rehearsed and started auditioning for drummers, and hired Aynsley Dunbar. With their line-up complete, Whitesnake headed up to Little Mountain Sound Studios in Vancouver, British Columbia, Canada, to lay plans for the new record. One of the first issues the band faced was Sykes' desire to achieve a specific guitar sound that he wanted, which he eventually found with the help of Coverdale's friend and engineer Bob Rock, who had previously worked with Bon Jovi on the multi-platinum album Slippery When Wet. According to Coverdale, there was a great potential and creativity between him and Sykes.

The next problem the band faced was a serious sinus infection with which Coverdale was stricken. This put the album's production behind schedule, especially when Coverdale underwent surgery and half a year-long rehabilitation program without a guarantee the voice would come back. While recovering, various invoices started circulating from Toronto and London, with Coverdale saying that "received no support from Sykes at that time" and "he did everything he could to take advantage of me being compromised". Allegedly Sykes grew impatient, claiming that the singer "used every excuse possible to explain why he didn’t want to record his vocals", and reportedly suggested bringing in a new vocalist and carrying on without Coverdale, which eventually led to the end of Coverdale's relationship with both Sykes and producer Mike Stone. Sykes thirty years later denied this: "Now I want to correct a rumour that I know has been out there for a long time. It's been said that when David was having his troubles, I went to Geffen and urged them to bring in another singer to replace him in Whitesnake. That's rubbish. How on earth could you ever have anyone fronting Whitesnake apart from David Coverdale?".

After Coverdale recovered, he started work on his vocal tracks with record producer Ron Nevison, before soon switching to Keith Olsen after few days because "it didn't sound good at all ... he [Ron] did great with other people, just not with me". Olsen asked him to sing "Still of the Night" in the first studio session, but although he almost vomited, "sang the song twice, fingers crossed – and that's what's on the record". Keyboard players Don Airey and Bill Cuomo were brought in to record some keyboard parts, as well as Dutch guitar player Adrian Vandenberg to record the guitar solo for the re-recorded version of the song "Here I Go Again" because Sykes disliked blues music. Coverdale was also discussing the possibility of Vandenberg soon joining Whitesnake.

By late 1986, with the recording process done and the album slated to be released in early 1987, Coverdale made the decision to let the other members of the band go, due to personal differences. According to Coverdale, he was facing trust issues with band members, his depression upon arrival to L.A. from a holiday in Munich, where he had seen his daughter from his first marriage, and a massive debt due to not working for two or three years.

Artwork
On the band's new logo and cover artwork, Coverdale worked with Canadian graphic artist Hugh Syme. Based on Coverdale's idea, Syme created a Celtic runic-style amulet with various elements representing the Sun, Moon, fertility and others.

Release
Titled Whitesnake in the US and Canada, the album was released on 23 March 1987. After entering the Billboard 200 chart at 72 on 18 April, it reached Top 10 on 9 May, and Top 5 on 30 May. Having peaked at number 2, the album hovered at or near its peak position over the course of seven months from 13 June 1987 to 23 January 1988, spending in total more weeks inside the top five than any other album in 1987 and charting for 76 weeks in total. It was barred from the top spot for 10 non-consecutive weeks by three different albums, including U2's The Joshua Tree, Whitney Houston's Whitney, and mostly Michael Jackson's Bad. According to Coverdale, the album was selling record-high for Warner Bros. "between 10 AM and noon, which was like 390,000" copies, the radio pushed it further to 800,000 copies, but the difference was MTV. It sold four million copies in all and as such was certified four-times Platinum by Recording Industry Association of America (RIAA) on 2 December 1987, and five-times Platinum on 7 January 1988. The last RIAA certification was eight-times Platinum on 10 February 1995. Reported total sales worldwide between 1990 and 2017 were more than 10-15 million.

Whitesnake's initial breakthrough was via album's single "Still of the Night" which video got a "tremendous amount of airplay" on MTV. The album also spawned two Billboard Hot 100 hit singles: "Here I Go Again '87" which reached number 1 on 10 October, and "Is This Love" which reached number 2 on 19 December. Both "Here I Go Again" and "Crying in the Rain" had previously been recorded with a different line-up and released on the 1982 album Saints & Sinners. The re-recording of "Here I Go Again" was advised by record label boss David Geffen and requested by A&R John Kalodner as a negotiation deal with Coverdale to re-record "Crying in the Rain" for the album.

In Europe, the album was simply called 1987, featuring a different running order and two extra tracks: "Looking for Love" and "You're Gonna Break My Heart Again". Coverdale considers "Looking for Love" one of the best songs he wrote with Sykes, but it was not included in the North American version because of Kalodner's preference for "Children of the Night" and time constraints of vinyl records limited to about 20 minutes a side. These two songs were for the first time released in North America in 1994 on Whitesnake's Greatest Hits compilation. In Japan, the album was titled Serpens Albus in reference to the illustrated text on the album's artwork, which means "white snake" in Latin, but with the North American tracklist. In Australia, the album was released as 1987 but had the North American track order on the original vinyl, and the European order on CD. In Bulgaria, the album was released on LP and cassette as 1987 and used a slightly modified version of the European track order, without "You're Gonna Break My Heart Again", while "Here I Go Again '87" replaced by "Here I Go Again '87 (Radio Mix)".

According to Chicago Tribune, in the year-end results of Billboards combined album and singles weekly charts, Whitesnake was among the Top 5 artists of the year with Bon Jovi, U2, Whitney Houston and Madonna, describing them as a "dark horse snuck into the Top 5 by quietly scoring big points with its Whitesnake LP, which spent much of the year in the Top 5 but never quite made it to No. 1. The band also scored big with 'Here I Go Again', a sleeper that had just one week at No. 1 but wound up as one of the year's Top 10 singles". According to Billboard, the band was also 8th among Top 100 Pop Album Artists, 22th among Top 100 Pop Singles Artists, 6th among Top 25 Pop Album Artists Duos/Groups and 15h among Top 25 Pop Singles Artists Duos/Groups, the album was 16th among Top 100 Pop Albums and 11th among Top 25 Pop Comact Disks, while single "Here I Go Again" was 7th among Top 100 Pop Singles and 19th among Top 25 Rock Tracks. Later Coverdale recalled that he did not expect such a success, and although was ready for it professionally he was not privately, where was constantly chased by the paparazzi because of which was forced to move from Los Angeles to Lake Tahoe.

Promotion
For the new line-up of the band, Coverdale enlisted guitarist Adrian Vandenberg (with whom he had already discussed plans), second guitarist Vivian Campbell, bassist Rudy Sarzo and drummer Tommy Aldridge. This line-up, called as "The Vid[eo] Kids" by Coverdale, toured in support of the album, and all appeared in music videos for "Still of the Night" (which was the most requested video on MTV when it was released), "Is This Love", "Here I Go Again" and "Give Me All Your Love", first three prominently alongside Coverdale's then new partner Tawny Kitaen, all with heavy MTV and radio airplay.

Reissue
For the 20th anniversary in May and June 2007, EMI released a remastered reissue of the original European version of the album, featuring two European songs previously unreleased in the North American version, live tracks, and a DVD with video clips and live performances.

For the 30th anniversary, on 6 October 2017, were released by Rhino Entertainment and Parlophone, the catalog division of Warner Music Group, a super deluxe edition (4CD/DVD box set containing the original album full tracklist in a newly remastered format along with a live recording from their 1987-1988 tour, demos and rehearsals, remixes and the DVD of music videos and tour bootlegs, as well as a book and a booklet with lyrics), a 1CD edition, a 2CD edition (second CD "Snakeskin Boots" includes live recordings from 1987 to 1988 tour), and 2LP edition (second LP including some remixes and live recordings).

Touring
The band with a new lineup went on a long tour which started in-front of over 80,000 people at sold-out Texxas Jam festival on 20 June 1987, and finished at Memorial Coliseum in Portland, Oregon, on 15 August 1988. The tour concerts were held in the United States, Canada, the United Kingdom, and Japan. During first part of the tour, they were an opening act for Mötley Crüe on their Girls, Girls, Girls Tour with good box-office success.

Reception

The album was generally met with positive reviews. According to music journalist Mick Wall, the album "wasn't just best Whitesnake album, it was one of the best rock albums of its era", while "Here I Go Again" became a "signature tune for Coverdale and Whitesnake. It's pretty, with beautifully soulful lead vocal for sure, but it's the 'My Way'-type ingredient of the lyrics ... that does it to ya every time". J. D. Considine favorably writing for Rolling Stone argued that although the album is perhaps lacking in originality having "every worthwhile mannerism and lick in the heavy-rock vocabulary" and a mixture of styles reminiscent of Led Zeppelin, Scorpions and Foreigner, "what makes it such a guilty pleasure, though, is that Coverdale isn't simply stealing licks; he and guitarist John Sykes understand the structure, pacing and drama of the old Led Zeppelin sound and deserve credit for concocting such a convincing simulacrum". Steve Huey and Bradley Torreano writing for AllMusic gave both North American and European versions the same rating of 4.5 stars out of 5, being "a collection of loud, polished hard rockers, plus the band's best set of pop hooks", however felt the European version is superior due to better tracklist flow and two more songs, especially "Looking for Love", which "a nice slow build to a blustery chorus makes this a classic David Coverdale ballad". The 20th, and 30th anniversary, reissues were also favorably received. The exception to these reviews was Robert Christgau, who in his negative review deemed that "the attraction of this veteran pop-metal has got to be total predictability. The glistening solos, the surging crescendos, the familiar macho love rhymes, the tunes you can hum before the verse is over--not one heard before, yet every one somehow known".

In 2019, magazine Rolling Stone ranked the album 12th among "50 Greatest Hair Metal Albums of All Time". In 2020, Metal Hammer included it among Top 20 best metal albums of 1987. In 2006, the 1987 version of "Here I Go Again" was ranked number 17 on VH1's 100 Greatest Songs of the '80s. In 2012 Reader's Poll of Rolling Stone it ranked as 9th among Top 10 "The Best Hair Metal Songs of All Time", while in 2017, The Daily Telegraph included it among 21 best power ballads. In 2015, Classic Rock ranked "Is This Love" as 7th on their list of Top 40 greatest power ballads. In 2009, the song "Still of the Night" was named as the 27th best hard rock song of all time by VH1. Its success in the US boosted its predecessor, Slide It In (1984), from Gold to double Platinum status by RIAA. It would see the band receive a nomination at the 1988 Brit Awards for Best British Group, as well as a nomination at the American Music Awards of 1988 for Favorite Pop/Rock Album.

Track listings

PersonnelWhitesnake David Coverdale – lead vocals
 John Sykes – guitars, backing vocals
 Neil Murray – bass
 Aynsley Dunbar – drums, percussionAdditional musicians Don Airey and Bill Cuomo – keyboards
 Adrian Vandenberg – guitar solo on "Here I Go Again"
 Dann Huff – guitar on "Here I Go Again '87" (Radio Mix)
 Mark Andes – bass on "Here I Go Again '87" (Radio Mix)
 Denny Carmassi – drums on "Here I Go Again '87" (Radio Mix)
 Vivian Campbell – guitar solo on "Give Me All Your Love" ('88 Mix)
   Tommy Funderburk – Backing vocals "Here I Go Again", "Is This Love", "Still of the Night", "Give Me All Your Love", "Don't Turn Away"Production'

 Produced by Mike Stone and Keith Olsen
 Mixed by Keith Olsen at Goodnight LA
 Mastered by Greg Fulginiti at Artisan Sound Recorders
 A&R by John Kalodner
 Cover by Hugh Syme
 All songs published by Whitesnake Music Overseas Ltd./WB Music Corp., except "Crying in the Rain" and "Here I Go Again" (published by Seabreeze Music Ltd./C.C. Songs Ltd./WB Music Corp.)

Charts

Weekly charts

Year-end charts

Certifications

Release history

Accolades

References

External links
 30th Anniversary Edition (2CD) by Rhino
 30th Anniversary Super Deluxe Edition at Rhino
 30th Anniversary Super Deluxe 1987 Unboxing by Coverdale at official YouTube channel WhitesnakeTV

Whitesnake albums
1987 albums
Albums produced by Keith Olsen
Albums produced by Mike Stone (record producer)
Geffen Records albums
CBS Records albums
EMI Records albums
Warner Records albums
Glam metal albums
Sony Music albums
Rhino Entertainment albums